Stratford University was a private university based in Virginia. Founded in 1976, Stratford delivered online, classroom, and blended online/classroom programs. It closed at the end of the Fall 2022 semester after losing its accreditation.

Stratford University had campuses in Virginia (Alexandria, Woodbridge,) Maryland (Baltimore), and India (New Delhi). The majority of the student body is non-traditional and works full-time while attending school. Stratford's international student body represents over thirty countries. Approximately 20 percent of the student body is international and 20 percent is military.

The Stratford campus in India was a joint venture with the Modi Group, created to offer residential American degrees in India. The legal name of the Indian joint venture is Modi Stratford Education Management (MSEM), Pvt. Ltd. The Modi Stratford Foundation, a wholly owned non-profit subsidiary of MSEM, delivers the academic programs in India as an unaccredited campus of Stratford University.

Stratford had been for-profit and in 2015, it converted to a public benefit corporation

History
Stratford University signed a letter of intent for an affiliation with Baltimore International College (BIC) on August 12, 2011. The university received approval from the Maryland Higher Education Commission and Baltimore officially became an additional location of Stratford University on December 1, 2011.

Stratford University signed a memorandum of understanding with Sojourner-Douglass College (SDC) on April 2, 2015. The memorandum outlined which SDC programs would transition to Stratford after June 30, 2015, the date that SDC would lose its accreditation. This location was renamed the Sojourner-Douglass Center at Stratford University.

Stratford University received the Virginia V3 Perseverando Award for both 2015 and 2016. The awards were presented to Stratford by Virginia Governor Terry McAuliffe of at the Annual Chamber of Commerce Workforce Conference in Richmond.

In 2016, U.S. Secretary of Commerce Penny Pritzker presented Stratford University with the President’s "E" Award for Exports. It is the highest recognition any U.S. entity can receive for making a significant contribution to the expansion of U.S. exports. The 'E' Awards noted Stratford University's dedication to providing quality education to students around the world, particularly its investment in language training programs.

In 2019, Stratford announced that it would be closing three of its campuses in Virginia, including campuses in Newport News and Virginia Beach. Noting Stratford's problems with its accreditor, The Center for Immigration Studies labeled the school as a "marginal university."  

In 2020, Stratford's accreditor, the Accrediting Council for Independent Colleges and Schools, was investigating the school for allegedly operating an unapproved program in Irbil, Iraq.

On September 26, 2022, the Virginia Department of Education decertified Stratford's accreditor, causing the university to announce that it would cease operations following the end of the Fall 2022 term.

On February 2, 2023, Stratford University filed for Chapter 7 bankruptcy.

Academics

Stratford awards graduate and undergraduate degrees in a number of disciplines including business administration, computer information systems, health sciences, nursing, culinary arts, and hotel management. Online, residential, and blended programs are available. All online and blended courses use the Stratford online Moodle platform hosted in Stratford's data center.

Stratford has established programs to help US military and former-US military personnel complete their education and is recognized by the Veterans Administration as a member of the Yellow Ribbon Program.
Stratford offers non-credit continuing education and professional development courses like Event Management Certificate Program,  Culinary Workshops and Certification Courses including Oracle, MSCE, .Net Framework, Cisco, Linux, and computer security-related topics for students and IT professionals.

Stratford's Language Institute offers an academic English as Second Language (ESL) program to help international students enter a degree program.

Rankings
Washington Monthly's 2020 rankings placed Stratford number 605 out of 614 masters-level universities in social mobility.

Accreditation and affiliations
Stratford University was accredited by the Accrediting Council for Independent Colleges and Schools (ACICS) to award degrees through the master's level. It was exempt from requirements of oversight to grant Associate, Bachelor's, Master's, and Doctorate degrees by State Council of Higher Education for Virginia (SCHEV).

Stratford's nursing program was approved by the Virginia Board of Nursing and accredited by the Commission on Collegiate Nursing Education. The university's medical assisting program was accredited by the Accrediting Bureau of Health Education Schools and its Language Institute was accredited by the Commission on English Language Program Accreditation.

Stratford's culinary programs were accredited by the American Culinary Federation (ACF).
Stratford was a member of the International Association of Culinary Professionals.

References

External links
 Official website

Private universities and colleges in Virginia
Distance education institutions
Colleges accredited by the Accrediting Council for Independent Colleges and Schools
Private universities and colleges in Washington, D.C.
Universities in Delhi
Educational institutions established in 1976
Companies that have filed for Chapter 7 bankruptcy
Education in Falls Church, Virginia
Education in Prince William County, Virginia
Education in Richmond, Virginia
1976 establishments in Virginia
Education in Alexandria, Virginia
Education in Newport News, Virginia
Education in Virginia Beach, Virginia
Universities and colleges in Baltimore